This is a list, in chronological order, of present and past offences to which the Catholic Church has attached the penalty of excommunication; the list is not exhaustive. In most cases these were "automatic excommunications", wherein the violator who knowingly breaks the rule is considered automatically excommunicated from the church regardless of whether a bishop (or the pope) has excommunicated them publicly. However, in a few cases a bishop would need to name the person who violated the rule for them to be excommunicated.

Excommunication is an ecclesiastical penalty placed on a person to encourage the person to return to the communion of the church. An excommunicated person cannot receive any sacraments or exercise an office within the church until the excommunication is lifted by a valid authority in the church (usually a bishop). Previously, other penalties could also be attached. In cases where excommunication is reserved for the apostolic see, only the bishop of Rome (the pope) has the power to lift the excommunication. Before 1869, the church distinguished "major" and "minor" excommunication; a major excommunication was often marked by simply writing, "Let them be anathema" in council documents. Only offences from the 1983 Code of Canon Law still have legal effect in the church.

First Council of Nicaea (325 AD)
 Any clergy or deacons who leave their church recklessly can be excommunicated if they fail to return to their dioceses.

Council of Saragossa (380)
 Anyone who continued to receive Holy Communion by hand. Reaffirmed at the Synod of Toledo (440). Ceased to be an offense in the Latin Church in 1969.

First Council of Constantinople (381)
 All who follow the following heresies: Eunomians, Anomoeans, Arians, Eudoxians, Semi-Arians, Pneumatomachi, Sabellians, Marcellians, Photinians and Apollinarians.

Council of Ephesus (431)
 Any laity who seek to upset the decisions of the council of Ephesus.
 Anyone who does not confess that Jesus is God and Mary is the Mother of God.
 Anyone who does not confess that the Word from God the Father has become flesh in Jesus Christ and is God and man in one flesh.
 Anyone who divides the hypostatic union of Christ and claims that the two aspects (divine and human) are not united.
 Anyone who asserts that some aspects of Jesus belong to his human part and others to his divine part, rather than belonging to both together.
 Anyone who says that Jesus was a God-bearing man and not God in Truth.
 Anyone who says that the Word from God was the master of Christ and not the same person.
 Anyone who says that Jesus as a man was activated by the Word of God and clothed with the glory of God, as though it was separate from him.
 Anyone who says that Jesus ought to be worshipped with the Divine Word.
 Anyone who says that Jesus' miracles and exorcism were done by the Holy Spirit as an alien power working through him, and not by Jesus' own spirit.
 Anyone who says that Jesus became our High Priest, but the Word of God did not become our High Priest, or that Jesus' sacrifice was for himself also.
 Anyone who says that the body of Christ is not the Word of God and is not life-giving.
 Anyone who does not confess that the Word of God became flesh, suffered, died and was resurrected.
 Any layperson who composes a new creed, different from the Nicene Creed, for the benefit of converting people.
 Any laity who follow the teachings of Nestorius or Charisius regarding the nature of Christ.
 Any laity in the region of Pamphylia who failed to sign the anathema against the Euchites.

Council of Chalcedon (451)
 People who found monasteries in dioceses without the bishop's approval, monks who do not obey the local bishop's authority or monasteries who accept slaves as monks without receiving permission from the slave's master.
 Religious and laity who run monasteries, martyrs' shrines or almshouses who do not obey the local bishop's authority.
 Monks or nuns who marry.
 If a bishop receives a priest into his diocese who belongs to another diocese, both the priest and the bishop are excommunicated.
 Those who concoct two natures of the Lord before the union but imagine a single one after the union.
 Religious or laity who attempt to produce another creed.
 Religious or laity who assist in a simoniacal ordination (i.e., buying the sacrament of holy orders).
 Priests or religious who go into military service or politics.
 Religious or laity who carry off girls under the pretext of cohabitation or who assist in this.

Second Council of Constantinople (553)
 All who support the works anathematized by the council.
 If anyone will not confess that the Father, Son and Holy Spirit have one nature or substance, that they have one power and authority, that there is a consubstantial Trinity, one Deity to be adored in three persons, let him be anathema.
 If anyone will not confess that the Word of God has two nativities, that which is before all ages from the Father, outside time and without a body, and secondly that nativity of these latter days when the Word of God came down from the heavens and was made flesh of holy and glorious Mary, mother of God and ever-virgin, and was born from her, let him be anathema.
 If anyone declares that the [Word] of God who works miracles is not identical with the Christ who suffered, or alleges that God the Word was with the Christ who was born of woman, or was in him in the way that one might be in another, but that our lord Jesus Christ was not one and the same, the word of God incarnate and made man, and that the miracles and the sufferings which he voluntarily underwent in the flesh were not of the same person, let him be anathema. 
 If anyone declares that it was only in respect of grace, or of principle of action, or of dignity or in respect of equality of honour, or in respect of authority, or of some relation, or of some affection or power that there was a unity made between the Word of God and the man, or if anyone alleges that it is in respect of good will, as if God the Word was pleased with the man, because he was well and properly disposed to God, as Theodore claims in his madness; or if anyone says that this union is only a sort of synonymity, as the Nestorians allege, who call the Word of God Jesus and Christ, and even designate the human separately by the names "Christ" and "Son", discussing quite obviously two different persons, and only pretending to speak of one person and one Christ when the reference is to his title, honour, dignity or adoration; finally, if anyone does not accept the teaching of the holy fathers that the union occurred of the Word of God with human flesh which is possessed by a rational and intellectual soul, and that this union is by synthesis or by person, and that therefore there is only one person, namely the lord Jesus Christ, one member of the holy Trinity, let him be anathema.
 If anyone understands by the single subsistence of our lord Jesus Christ that it covers the meaning of many subsistences, and by this argument tries to introduce into the mystery of Christ two subsistences or two persons, and having brought in two persons then talks of one person only in respect of dignity, honour or adoration, as both Theodore and Nestorius have written in their madness; if anyone falsely represents the holy synod of Chalcedon, making out that it accepted this heretical view by its terminology of "one subsistence", and if he does not acknowledge that the Word of God is united with human flesh by subsistence, and that on account of this there is only one subsistence or one person, and that the holy synod of Chalcedon thus made a formal statement of belief in the single subsistence of our lord Jesus Christ, let him be anathema. 
 If anyone declares that it can be only inexactly and not truly said that the holy and glorious ever-virgin Mary is the mother of God, or says that she is so only in some relative way, considering that she bore a mere man and that God the Word was not made into human flesh in her, holding rather that the nativity of a man from her was referred, as they say, to God the Word as he was with the man who came into being; if anyone misrepresents the holy synod of Chalcedon, alleging that it claimed that the virgin was the mother of God only according to that heretical understanding which the blasphemous Theodore put forward; or if anyone says that she is the mother of a man or the Christ-bearer, that is the mother of Christ, suggesting that Christ is not God, and does not formally confess that she is properly and truly the mother of God, because he who before all ages was born of the Father, God the Word, has been made into human flesh in these latter days and has been born to her, and it was in this religious understanding that the holy synod of Chalcedon formally stated its belief that she was the mother of God, let him be anathema. 
 If anyone, when speaking about the two natures, does not confess a belief in our one lord Jesus Christ, understood in both his divinity and his humanity, so as by this to signify a difference of natures of which an ineffable union has been made without confusion, in which neither the nature of the Word was changed into the nature of human flesh, nor was the nature of human flesh changed into that of the Word (each remained what it was by nature, even after the union, as this had been made in respect of subsistence); and if anyone understands the two natures in the mystery of Christ in the sense of a division into parts, or if he expresses his belief in the plural natures in the same lord Jesus Christ, God the Word made flesh, but does not consider the difference of those natures, of which he is composed, to be only in the onlooker's mind, a difference which is not compromised by the union (for he is one from both and the two exist through the one) but uses the plurality to suggest that each nature is possessed separately and has a subsistence of its own, let him be anathema. 
 If anyone confesses a belief that a union has been made out of the two natures divinity and humanity, or speaks about the one nature of God the Word made flesh, but does not understand these things according to what the fathers have taught, namely that from the divine and human natures a union was made according to subsistence, and that one Christ was formed, and from these expressions tries to introduce one nature or substance made of the deity and human flesh of Christ, let him be anathema. 
 Those who divide (or split up) the mystery of the divine dispensation of Christ and those who introduce into that mystery some confusion are equally rejected and anathematized by the church of God. 
 If anyone says that Christ is to be worshipped in his two natures, and by that wishes to introduce two adorations, a separate one for God the Word and another for the man; or if anyone, so as to remove the human flesh or to mix up the divinity and the humanity, monstrously invents one nature or substance brought together from the two, and so worships Christ, but not by a single adoration God the Word in human flesh along with his human flesh, as has been the tradition of the church from the beginning, let him be anathema. 
 If anyone does not confess his belief that our lord Jesus Christ, who was crucified in his human flesh, is truly God and the Lord of glory and one of the members of the holy Trinity, let him be anathema. 
 If anyone does not anathematize Arius, Eunomius, Macedonius, Apollinarius Nestorius, Eutyches and Origen, their heretical books and all other heretics who have already been condemned and anathematized by the holy, catholic and apostolic church and by the four holy synods which have already been mentioned, and also all those who have thought or now think in the same way as the aforesaid heretics and who persist in their error even to death, let him be anathema. 
 If anyone defends the heretical Theodore of Mopsuestia, who said that God the Word is one, while quite another is Christ, who was troubled by the passions of the soul and the desires of human flesh, was gradually separated from that which is inferior, and became better by his progress in good works, and could not be faulted in his way of life, and as a mere man was baptized in the name of the Father and the Son and the holy Spirit, and through this baptism received the grace of the holy Spirit and came to deserve sonship and to be adored, in the way that one adores a statue of the emperor, as if he were God the Word, and that he became after his resurrection immutable in his thoughts and entirely without sin. Furthermore, this heretical Theodore claimed that the union of God the Word to Christ is rather like that which, according to the teaching of the Apostle, is between a man and his wife: The two shall become one. Among innumerable other blasphemies he dared to allege that, when after his resurrection the Lord breathed on his disciples and said, Receive the holy Spirit, he was not truly giving them the holy Spirit, but he breathed on them only as a sign. Similarly he claimed that Thomas's profession of faith made when, after his resurrection, he touched the hands and side of the Lord, namely My Lord and my God, was not said about Christ, but that Thomas was in this way extolling God for raising up Christ and expressing his astonishment at the miracle of the resurrection. This Theodore makes a comparison which is even worse than this when, writing about the acts of the Apostles, he says that Christ was like Plato, Manichaeus, Epicurus and Marcion, alleging that just as each of these men arrived at his own teaching and then had his disciples called after him Platonists, Manichaeans, Epicureans and Marcionites, so Christ found his teaching and then had disciples who were called Christians. If anyone offers a defence for this more heretical Theodore, and his heretical books in which he throws up the aforesaid blasphemies and many other additional blasphemies against our great God and saviour Jesus Christ, and if anyone fails to anathematize him and his heretical books as well as all those who offer acceptance or defence to him, or who allege that his interpretation is correct, or who write on his behalf or on that of his heretical teachings, or who are or have been of the same way of thinking and persist until death in this error, let him be anathema. 
 If anyone defends the heretical writings of Theodoret which were composed against the true faith, against the first holy synod of Ephesus and against holy Cyril and his Twelve Chapters, and defends what Theodoret wrote to support the heretical Theodore and Nestorius and others who think in the same way as the aforesaid Theodore and Nestorius and accept them or their heresy and if anyone, because of them, shall accuse of being heretical the doctors of the church who have stated their belief in the union according to subsistence of God the Word; and if anyone does not anathematize these heretical books and those who have thought or now think in this way, and all those who have written against the true faith or against holy Cyril and his twelve chapters, and who persist in such heresy until they die, let him be anathema. 
 If anyone defends the letter which Ibas is said to have written to Mari the Persian, which denies that God the Word, who became incarnate of Mary the holy mother of God and ever-virgin, became man, alleging that he was only a man born to her, whom it describes as a temple, as if God the Word was one and the man someone quite different; which condemns holy Cyril as if he were a heretic, when he gives the true teaching of Christians, and accuses holy Cyril of writing opinions like those of the heretical Apollinarius; which rebukes the first holy synod of Ephesus, alleging that it condemned Nestorius without going into the matter by a formal examination; which claims that the twelve chapters of holy Cyril are heretical and opposed to the true faith; and which defends Theodore and Nestorius and their heretical teachings and books. If anyone defends the said letter and does not anathematize it and all those who offer a defence for it and allege that it or a part of it is correct, or if anyone defends those who have written or shall write in support of it or the heresies contained in it, or supports those who are bold enough to defend it or its heresies in the name of the holy fathers of the holy synod of Chalcedon, and persists in these errors until his death, let him be anathema.

Third Council of Constantinople (680-681)
Any religious or laity who attempt to produce another faith, to make or teach or support a new creed, or who use new definitions or novelties or terminology that somehow cancels what has been defined by the council.

Second Council of Nicaea (787)
 All religious or laity who follow heretics mentioned at the council in rejecting church tradition, all who devise innovations, who spurn the things trusted to the church, who fabricate evil prejudices against the church's tradition, or who secularize sacred objects or holy monasteries.
 Any who are in communion with a bishop who acquires his diocese through the help of secular rulers.
 Any ruler who prevents the required canonical gatherings of bishops to take place.
 Any laity or religious who is found to be hiding writings composed against the venerable icons.
 Any laity or religious who had seized certain houses belonging to the church referred to in the council and failed to return them.
 Anyone who follows the teachings of Arius.
 Anyone who follows the teachings of Nestorius.
 Anyone who follows the teachings of Severus of Antioch and Peter the Fuller.
 Anyone who follows the teachings of Sergius I of Constantinople, Pyrrhus of Constantinople, Pope Honorius I, Cyrus of Alexandria, and Macarius I of Antioch.
 If anyone does not confess that Christ our God can be represented in his humanity, let him be anathema.
 If anyone does not accept representation in art of evangelical scenes, let him be anathema.
 If anyone does not salute such representations as standing for the Lord and his saints, let him be anathema.
 If anyone rejects any written or unwritten tradition of the church, let him be anathema.
 Any laity or religious who assist in a simoniacal purchase of ordination.

Fourth Council of Constantinople (869-870)
 Any religious or lay person who fails to obey the decrees of several popes named by the council is excommunicated.
 Any lay person who invites a person excommunicated by the council to paint sacred images or to teach is himself excommunicated.
 Any lay person who fails to observe the council's decrees concerning the voiding of contracts made by Photius is excommunicated.
 Any emperor or powerful person who mocks holy things in the manner described by the council or who allows such mockery to take place of things proper to priests, is excommunicated unless he repents quickly.
 All others who engage in the same crime as described above are punished with a three-year excommunication.
 Any metropolitan bishop who refuses to come to his patriarch when summoned unless delayed by pagan invasion or genuine illness, or if he pretends to have no knowledge of the summoning (when he does) or hides in some way, is excommunicated.
 Any archbishop or metropolitan who, under the pretext of an official visitation, visits other dioceses and greedily consumes what belongs the other dioceses, is excommunicated.
 Any bishop who grants the property of a diocese other than his own as a gift to someone or who installs priests in another diocese is excommunicated.
 Anyone who rejects the council's directive that a metropolitan can only be judged by a patriarch and not by another metropolitan is excommunicated.
 All who follow the teachings of Arius are excommunicated.
 All who claim that the Divine Word came about and existed by fantasy and supposition.
 All religious and lay people who reject the council's condemnation of Photius or support him are excommunicated.
 All who are not disposed to venerate the icons of Jesus Christ, the Virgin Mary, the angels or saints are excommunicated.
 All who act "deceitfully and fraudulently and falsifies the word of truth and goes through the motions of having false vicars or composes books full of deceptions and explains them in favour of his own designs" are excommunicated.
 All who believe that the human being has two souls, rather than one, are excommunicated.
 Whoever buys (or acquires) property belonging to the church, when the bishop selling or giving this property did not have the right to sell or give it, and who fails to return this property after buying or acquiring it, is excommunicated.
 Any secular person who removes goods or privileges from the church by force is excommunicated.
 Any secular ruler who attempts to use force to expel the pope or a patriarch is excommunicated.
 Any secular ruler or lay person who attempts to act against the proper legal process in a canonical election for a bishop is excommunicated.

First Lateran Council (1123)
 All who carry off or violate the family or property of crusaders while they are on crusade. 
 All laity who take offerings from the altars or crosses from any church.
 Any person who violates a truce and fails to listen to a bishop's admonition to make reparation when the admonition is given three times.
 Any military person who seizes the city of Benevento (a papal possession).
 Anyone who harms churches or people who work in them.

Sicut Judaeis
 All who violate the bull's rules concerning the protection of Jews and the forbidding of their forced conversion are excommunicated.

Second Lateran Council (1139)
 Any person who violently attacks a cleric or monk is subject to excommunication (reserved to the apostolic see).
 Women who are not following the rule of Benedict, Basil or Augustine, and pose as nuns and receive guests and secular persons in violation of good morals. 
 Canons of the episcopal see who prevent new elections of bishops from taking place in vacant dioceses.
 Crossbowmen and archers who fight against Christians.
 Anyone who illicitly seizes the goods of a deceased bishop.
 Laypeople in possession of churches who fail to restore them to bishops.
 A person who ignores warnings of a bishop three times to follow a Christian truce.
 Anyone who lays hands on someone who flees to a church or cemetery.
 Anyone who engages in arson or who assists an arsonist.

Third Lateran Council (1179)
 Laity who appoint or dismiss clerics from churches, or who seize, tax or distribute church property according to their own will.
 People who impose unjust burdens on churches and who seize the goods of the church.
 Christians who share the same household with Jews or Muslims.
 Those who accept the testimony of Jewish witnesses over the testimony of Christian witnesses in legal cases.
 All who support, receive or trade with Cathars.
 Those who claim to be Pope and their supporters, after an election which fails to reach the required two-thirds majority.
 Anyone who acts against the council's decree regarding the return of property taken by schismatics.
 Any layperson who transfers their tithe to other lay persons.
 Any layperson who engages in the "unnatural vice" for which the wrath of God came upon Sodom and Gomorrah
 A person who ignores warnings of a bishop three times to follow a Christian truce.
 Anyone who sells wood, weapons or other materials to Muslims which can be used to fight wars with Christians, or who hires himself out to be a captain or pilot of a Muslim warship (the same decree also called on Catholics to confiscate their possessions and enslave the person who was caught doing this). 
 Those who rob Romans or other Christians who sail for trade or honourable purposes.
 Those who rob shipwrecked Christians.
 Any Christian prince who seizes or fails to return the possessions of Jews who have converted to Christianity.
 Anyone who molests a crusader fighting against the Cathars.

Fourth Lateran Council (1215)
 All heretics.
 All who are held suspect of heresy and who fail to prove their innocence.
 All temporal rulers who do not expel heretics from their lands after they have been instructed by the church to do so.
 Catholics who receive, defend or support heretics.
 Any who refuse to avoid contact with heretics pointed out by the church and branded as infamous.
 All who become preachers of the gospel without church approval.
 Any in the Greek Church who wash altars after they have been used by Latin Catholics in order to cleanse them, or who re-baptize people already baptized by Latin Catholics.
 Any bishop who violates the rules the council set down for a diocese that has believers with different languages and rites.
 Those who presume to impose taxes on the church.
 Crusaders who refuse to carry out vows they made to go on crusade. 
 Those who fail to carry out the duties the council set on them for raising money for the crusade.
 Any Christians who engage in dealings with Jews who practise usury. 
 All corsairs and pirates of the Mediterranean Sea.
 All Christians who supply timber for ships, iron or arms to Muslims (the same decree also called on Christians to enslave people who did this).
 Those who engage in tournaments from 1215-1218.
 Christians who failed to observe universal peace in Christendom between 1215 and 1219.
 All physicians who provide treatment to help a person's body which is a danger to the person's soul.

First Council of Lyons (1245)
 All who offer "advice, help or favour" to excommunicated Emperor Frederick II are automatically excommunicated.
 Any Christian ruler who uses assassins to kill people with the intention of catching them in a state of mortal sin when killed (so the assassinated persons are punished with eternal damnation in hell) incurs automatic excommunication.
 Any who are guilty in deceit with regard to the measures intended to help fund the crusade called for by the council are automatically excommunicated.
 All Christians who engage in dealings with Jews who are usurers.
 Corsairs and pirates on the Mediterranean, their principal helpers and supporters.
 Christians who sold iron, timber for ships or arms to Muslims.
 All who engage in tournaments from 1245 to 1248.
 Christians who failed to observe universal peace in Christendom from 1245 to 1249.
 All Christians who take their ships to Muslim ports from 1245 to 1249.

Second Council of Lyons (1274)
 "All who knowingly offer hindrance, directly or indirectly, publicly or secretly, to the payment" for the crusade proposed at the council.
 Corsairs and pirates on the Mediterranean, their principal helpers and supporters.
 Christians who engage in business dealings with pirates and corsairs on the Mediterranean (the decree called for these people to be enslaved).
 Christians who sold iron, timber for ships or arms to Muslims.
 Christians who failed to observe a universal peace in Christendom from 1274 to 1280.
 All Christians who take their ships to Muslim ports from 1274 to 1280.
 Anyone outside of a papal conclave who attempts to send a message or communicate with a cardinal in a conclave received a latae sententiae excommunication.
 Civil authorities in control of a town or city in which a papal conclave is taking place who commit fraud with regard to their obligations towards the conclave received a latae sententiae excommunication.
 Anyone who oppresses clerics or other ecclesiastical persons, because they did not elect the person that the oppressor desired elected or for other reasons, received a latae sententiae excommunication.
 All who attempt to unlawfully take offices or dignities during a vacancy, along with anyone who helps them, received a latae sententiae excommunication.
 All who use force or fear to get an ecclesiastical authority to lift an excommunication from someone are themselves excommunicated.
 All who unlawfully seize church property received a latae sententiae excommunication.
 Those who violated what the council set down in Article 23 regarding religious houses are excommunicated.
 Lay people who rent houses to usurers or fail to expel them are excommunicated.
Those who engage in "reprisals" against ecclesiastical persons receive a latae sententiae excommunication.
 Anyone who, using someone else's excommunication as a pretext, decides to kill, molest or otherwise harm the excommunicated person or his goods because he is excommunicated, is himself excommunicated; those who persist longer than two months receive an excommunication reserved to the apostolic see.

Council of Vienne (1311)
 All who fail to follow the council's instructions regarding the suppression of the Knights Templar.
 All who attempt to enter the Templars, wear their habit or act as though they are a Templar.
 All who knowingly give counsel, aid or favour to those occupying or detaining property belonging to the Knights Hospitaller.
 Hospitallers who publicly receive excommunicated persons, those under interdict, notorious usurers, those who give them Catholic burials, the sacraments or solemnize their marriages.

Council of Constance (1414-1418)

Council of Basel–Ferrara–Florence (1431-1445)
Since theological historians have doubts about the ecumenical character of council sessions, the session number and location of each ruling are included:
 (Session 4 - Basel) All who fail to obey the council's command to call on the Pope to attend the council and to revoke his previous dissolution of the council.
 (Session 4 - Basel) All who attempt to go against what the council commanded in saying that should the papal office become vacant during the council, the new election for a pope would be held at the council.
 (Session 8 - Basel) All who attempt to convoke a rival council at Bologna or anywhere else while this council was taking place.
 (Session 12- Basel) All who take part in simoniacal elections (i.e., making someone pope or bishop through bribery) receive an automatic excommunication reserved to the Holy See.
 (Session 19- Basel) Anyone who vexes or makes an issue out of property that a convert unjustly held but had given to the church, and which the church then put to pious use.
 (Session 2 -Ferrara) All who directly or indirectly attempt to molest people attending the Council receive an automatic excommunication reserved to the Holy See.
 (Session 31-Ferrara) All who continue to hold council at Basel while the Council of Ferrara is convoked are automatically excommunicated.
 (Session 31-Ferrara) All civil authorities at Basel who fail to expel those attending the Council of Basel after 30 days.
 (Session 31-Ferrara) All who continue to travel to Basel or trade there, if the members of the Council of Basel continue to meet there after 30 days.
 (Session 31-Ferrara) All merchants doing business in Basel who fail to leave while the Council of Basel continues to take place.
 (Session 11-Florence) All who reject the Council's teaching concerning the Trinity.
 (Session 14-Florence) All who claim that Chaldean or Maronite Catholics are heretics.

Fifth Lateran Council (1512-1517)
 Any cardinal who engages in a simoniacal papal election (i.e., electing someone to the papacy through bribery) incurs a latae sententiae excommunication reserved to the apostolic see.
 Whoever violated the terms of the bull, Pastoralis officii, incurs a latae sententiae excommunication reserved to the Apostolic See.
 Those who were called to the council and do not attend without legitimate excuse incur excommunication.
 Any cleric who wears multicoloured clothing not in keeping with his clerical status, whose clothes are not at least ankle-length, or any head of a cathedral, Catholic college or chaplain to a cardinal who fails to wear a head covering in public, or clerics who pay too much attention to their hair or beards, or clerics who use silk and velvet instead of cloth and leather for their horses or mules, receives excommunication if he continues to do so after receiving a legitimate warning.
 Any cardinal who participated in a consistory who reveals the votes cast there, or who reveals what was said or done during a consistory if this information was meant to be kept secret or could be damaging to the church or a participant at the conclave, receives a penalty of latae sententiae excommunication reserved to the Apostolic See.
 Secular rulers who seize church property and fail to return it receive a latae sententiae excommunication.
 Secular rulers who exact tithes or taxes from clerics, even if the clerics freely agree to it, are excommunicated.
 Those who provide help or advice to rulers attempting to do the above are also excommunicated.
 Priests who freely give church property to civil authorities without permission from the pope are also automatically excommunicated.
 Laypeople who engage in sorcery are excommunicated.
 Anyone who attempts to rashly make commentaries or interpretations of the constitutions of the council without permission receive a penalty of automatic excommunication.
 All religious or clergy who preach or argue against the council's decision on the reform of credit organizations are subject to automatic excommunication.
 Church authorities who do not give the required written warrants for publishing books freely and without delay are excommunicated.
 Any publisher who acts against the church's rules concerning punishments for printing banned books is excommunicated.
 Anyone who fails to observe the council's commands regarding visions and revelations (that they are to be first subject to examination by the pope, or the local ordinary if the pope is not available, before being publicized) receive a penalty of latae sententiae excommunication reserved to the apostolic see.
 Those who act contrary to the council's decisions regarding the pragmatic sanction are punished with an automatic excommunication.
 Procurators, business agents and workers assisting excommunicated persons trying to enter a mendicant order are themselves excommunicated.
 Anyone who attempts to interpret or gloss what was done in the council without permission is automatically excommunicated.

Council of Trent (1545-1563)

In eminenti apostolates (1738)
Catholics who join masonic lodges or who take part in their meetings are excommunicated.

Apostolicae Sedis Moderationi (1869)
all who fight duels, or challenge to a duel or accept such challenge; as well as against all who are accessory to the or who in any way abet or encourage the same; and finally against those who are present at a duel as spectators [de industria spectantes], or those who permit the same, or do not prevent it, whatever their rank, even if they were kings or emperors

First Vatican Council (1869-1870)
 If anyone denies the one true God, creator and lord of things visible and invisible, let him be anathema.
 If anyone is so bold as to assert that there exists nothing besides matter, let him be anathema.
 If anyone says that the substance or essence of God and all things are one and the same, let him be anathema.
 If anyone says that finite things corporal and spiritual or, at any rate, spiritual, emanated from the divine substance; or that the divine essence, by the manifestation and evolution of itself becomes all things or, finally, that God is a universal or indefinite being which by self-determination establishes the totality of things distinct in genera, species and individuals, let him be anathema.
 If anyone does not confess that the world and all things which are contained in it, both spiritual and material, were produced according to their whole substance out of nothing by God; or holds that God did not create by his will free from all necessity, but as necessarily as he necessarily loves himself; or denies that the world was created for the glory of God, let him be anathema.
 If anyone says that the one true God, our creator and lord, cannot be known with certainty from the things that have been made by the natural light of human reason, let him be anathema.
 If anyone says that it is impossible (or not expedient) that human beings should be taught by means of divine revelation about God and the worship that should be shown him, let him be anathema.
 If anyone says that a human being cannot be divinely elevated to a knowledge and perfection which exceeds the natural but, of himself, can (and must) reach finally the possession of all truth and goodness by continual development, let him be anathema.
 If anyone does not receive as sacred and canonical the complete books of sacred scripture with all their parts (as the holy council of Trent listed them) or denies that they were divinely inspired, let him be anathema.
 If anyone says that human reason is so independent that faith cannot be commanded by God, let him be anathema.
 If anyone says that divine faith is not to be distinguished from natural knowledge about God and moral matters and, consequently, that for divine faith it is not required that revealed truth should be believed because of the authority of God who reveals it, let him be anathema.
 If anyone says that divine revelation cannot be made credible by external signs and that, therefore, men and women ought to be moved to faith only by each one's internal experience or private inspiration, let him be anathema.
 If anyone says that all miracles are impossible and, therefore, all reports of them (even those contained in sacred scripture) are to be set aside as fables or myths; or that miracles can never be known with certainty, nor the divine origin of the Christian religion be proved from them, let him be anathema.
 If anyone says that the assent to Christian faith is not free, but is necessarily produced by arguments of human reason; or that the grace of God is necessary only for living faith which works by charity, let him be anathema.
 If anyone says that the condition of the faithful and those who have not yet attained to the only true faith is alike, so that Catholics may have a just cause for calling in doubt (by suspending their assent) the faith which they have already received from the teaching of the church until they have completed a scientific demonstration of the credibility and truth of their faith, let him be anathema.
 If anyone says that in divine revelation there are contained no true mysteries properly so-called, but all dogmas of the faith can be understood and demonstrated by properly-trained reason from natural principles, let him be anathema.
 If anyone says that human studies are to be treated with such liberty that their assertions may be maintained as true even when they are opposed to divine revelation and they may not be forbidden by the church, let him be anathema.
 If anyone says that it is possible that at some time, given the advancement of knowledge, a sense may be assigned to the dogmas propounded by the church which is different from that which the church has understood and understands, let him be anathema.
 If anyone says that blessed Peter the apostle was not appointed by Christ the lord as prince of all the apostles and visible head of the whole church militant; or that it was a primacy of honour only and not true and proper jurisdiction which he directly and immediately received from our lord Jesus Christ himself, let him be anathema.
 If anyone says that it is not by the institution of Christ the lord himself (that is to say, by divine law) that blessed Peter should have perpetual successors in primacy over the whole church; or that the Roman pontiff is not the successor of blessed Peter in this primacy, let him be anathema.
 If anyone says that the Roman pontiff has merely an office of supervision and guidance and not the full and supreme power of jurisdiction over the whole church, and this not only in matters of faith and morals but also in those which concern the discipline and government of the church dispersed throughout the whole world; or that he has only the principal part, but not the absolute fullness, of this supreme power; or that this power of his is not ordinary and immediate over the churches, the pastors and the faithful, let him be anathema.
 [We] define as a divinely revealed dogma that when the Roman pontiff speaks ex cathedra [...] such definitions of the Roman pontiff are of themselves, and not by the consent of the church, irreformable. [S]hould anyone, which God forbid, have the temerity to reject this definition of ours: let him be anathema.

1917 Code of Canon Law

The first unified code of canon law was produced in 1917, and it replaced all previous rules regarding excommunication which had come from councils and papal documents. The 1983 Code of Canon Law replaced the 1917 code. Therefore, only the 1983 code still has legal standing with regard to excommunicable offences.

Decree Against Communism (1949)

 Catholics who defend or promote materialistic or atheistic Communist doctrine incur excommunication.

1983 Code of Canon Law

Canon 1364 - An apostate from the faith, a heretic, or a schismatic incurs a latae sententiae excommunication.
Canon 1367 - A person who throws away consecrated species, or takes (or retains) them for a sacrilegious purpose, incurs a latae sententiae excommunication reserved to the apostolic see.
Canon 1370 -  A person who uses physical force against the Roman pontiff incurs a latae sententiae excommunication reserved to the apostolic see.
Canon 1378 - A priest who acts against the prescript of Canon 977 incurs a latae sententiae excommunication reserved to the apostolic see. (Canon 977 prohibits a priest from giving absolution to someone with whom he has had unlawful carnal relations).
Canon 1379 § 3 - Both a person who attempts to confer a sacred order on a woman, and the woman who attempts to receive the sacred order.
Canon 1382 - A bishop who consecrates a bishop without a pontifical mandate, and the person who receives the consecration, incur a latae sententiae excommunication reserved to the apostolic see.
Canon 1388 - A confessor who directly violates the sacramental seal incurs a latae sententiae excommunication reserved to the apostolic see.
Canon 1398 - A person who procures a completed abortion incurs a latae sententiae excommunication.

Canon 1324 includes a number of exceptions from excommunicable offences:
By a person who had only the imperfect use of reason;
By a person who lacked the use of reason because of drunkenness or similar culpable disturbance of mind;
From grave heat of passion which did not precede (and hinder) all deliberation of mind and consent of will, provided that the passion itself had not been stimulated or fostered voluntarily;
By a minor who has not yet completed the age of sixteen years;
By a person who was coerced by grave fear (even if only relatively-grave), or due to necessity or grave inconvenience if the delict is intrinsically evil or tends to the harm of souls;
By a person who acted without due moderation against an unjust aggressor for the sake of legitimate self-defense or defense of another;
Against someone who gravely and unjustly provokes the person;
By a person who thought (in culpable error) that one of the circumstances mentioned in Canon 1323, numbers 4 or 5 was present;
By a person who, without negligence, did not know that a penalty was attached to a law or precept;
By a person who acted without full imputability, provided that the imputability was grave.

According to Canon 1329, unnamed accomplices may receive the same penalty when an excommunicable act is committed.

See also

List of people excommunicated by the Catholic Church
1917 Code of Canon Law
Council of Chalcedon
Council of Constance
Council of Ephesus
Council of Florence
Council of Trent
Council of Vienne
Fifth Council of the Lateran
First Council of Constantinople
First Council of the Lateran
First Council of Lyon
First Council of Nicaea
First Vatican Council
Fourth Council of Constantinople
Fourth Council of the Lateran
Peace and Truce of God
Second Council of Constantinople
Second Council of the Lateran
Second Council of Lyon
Second Council of Nicaea
Sicut Judaeis
Third Council of Constantinople
Third Council of the Lateran
Tournament (medieval)

References

Notes

Catholic theology and doctrine
L
E